Narayan Rane was sworn in as Chief Minister of Maharashtra state of India on 1 February 1999 as the leader of Shiv Sena- Bharatiya Janata Party alliance. He was elected as leader of the alliance following resignation of Manohar Joshi. There were 24 cabinet ministers (excluding himself) – 12 each from Shiv Sena and Bharatiya Janata Party.

Cabinet rank ministers

From Shiv Sena

Radhakrishna Vikhe Patil
Sudhir Joshi
Pramod Navalkar
Leeladhar Dake
Sabir Shaikh
 Dr Jaiprakash Mundada
Babanrao Gholap
Chandrakant Khaire
Sureshdada Jain
Diwakar Raote
Gajanan Kirtikar

From Bharatiya Janata Party
Gopinath Munde-Deputy Chief Minister
Nitin Gadkari
Anna Dange
Mahadeo Shivankar
Shobha Phadanvis
 Dr Daulatrao Aher
Haribhau Bagade
Eknath Khadse
Dattatraya Rane
Prakash Mehta
Sudhir Mungantiwar
Vishnu Savara

Ministers of State

From Shiv Sena

Prabhakar More – Minister of state for Home
Ravindra Mane – Minister of State for Urban Development
Ramdas Kadam 
Arjun Khotkar
Prataprao Ganpatrao Jadhav
Kalidas Kolambkar
Uttamprakash Khandare
Manisha Nimkar

From Bharatiya Janata Party
Raj Purohit
Vinod Gudadhe Patil
Vinayak Korde 
Vijay Girkar
Pratapsinh Mohite-Patil
Udayanraje Bhosale

Independents
Harshavardhan Patil 
Anil Deshmukh
Shivajirao Naik
Babasaheb Dhabekar
Vijaykumar Gavit
Dilip Sopal
Badamrao Pandit
Dr Ramesh Gajbe
Bharmuanna Patil

See also 
Manohar Joshi ministry

References

Rane
Shiv Sena
Bharatiya Janata Party state ministries
1999 establishments in Maharashtra
1999 disestablishments in India
Cabinets established in 1999
Cabinets disestablished in 1999